Rufous-tailed jungle flycatcher has been split into the following species:
 Philippine jungle flycatcher, Cyornis ruficauda
 Sulu jungle flycatcher, Cyornis ocularis
 Crocker jungle flycatcher, Cyornis ruficrissa

Birds by common name